John Clark (sometimes spelled Clarke) (February 28, 1766October 12, 1832) was an American planter and politician.

Early life
Clark was born in 1766 in Edgecombe County, North Carolina. Along with his father, Elijah Clarke, Clark fought in the American Revolutionary War at the Battle of Kettle Creek and served in the Georgia militia.

He moved to Wilkes County, Georgia, in the early 1770s. He became a major general in 1796.

Political career

Clark served as a presidential elector in the 1816 presidential election. He served in the Georgia House of Representatives before he was elected to consecutive two-year terms as the 31st Governor, from 1819 to 1823. During his term, he successfully defended states' rights in a US Supreme Court case, Ex parte Madrazzo, over a Spanish citizen who claimed that he owned some of Clark's slaves.

Personal life
Clark resided at Woodville, a plantation in Milledgeville, Georgia. He was married to Nancy Clark.

Death and legacy
Clark died of yellow fever in St. Andrews Bay (Florida) in 1832 in what was then Washington County (now Bay County) and was buried in that same city; however, his grave was relocated to Marietta National Cemetery in Georgia in 1923 by the Daughters of the American Revolution.

Clarkesville, Georgia and Clarke County, Alabama are named after him.

References

Sources
"John Clark (1766-1832)," New Georgia Encyclopedia.
Georgia State Archives Roster of State Governors
Georgia Governor's Gravesites Field Guide (1776-2003)
Georgia Secretary of State official website
John Clark House historical marker

External links
 Troup-Clarke Political Feud historical marker

1766 births
1832 deaths
People from Edgecombe County, North Carolina
Governors of Georgia (U.S. state)
Members of the Georgia House of Representatives
Georgia (U.S. state) militiamen in the American Revolution
Deaths from yellow fever
People of Georgia (U.S. state) in the American Revolution
Infectious disease deaths in Florida
Burials in Georgia (U.S. state)
Georgia (U.S. state) Democratic-Republicans
Democratic-Republican Party state governors of the United States
American planters
American slave owners
American duellists
People from Wilkes County, Georgia
1816 United States presidential electors